Maisa da Silva Andrade (born 22 May 2002) is a Brazilian television presenter and actress. She first gained fame for hosting the children's TV program Bom Dia & Cia from the age of six years old, and for playing the role of Valéria Ferreira in the Carrossel franchise, including a telenovela and two films. In 2022, she began playing the character Anita in the Netflix teen drama series Back to 15.

Personal life
Maisa was raised in the city of São José dos Campos by her father Celso de Araújo Andrade, a telephone technician, and by her mother Gislaine de Souza Silva Andrade, a homemaker. When she was three years old, she pleaded with her mother to let her perform on television, and in July 2005 her mother began taking her to television producers.

Career
At the age of three in 2005, Maisa appeared in the Programa Raul Gil as musical lipsyncer and singer. Raul Gil brought her to record music on Rede Record and then on Rede Bandeirantes.

In 2007, she signed with SBT to present children's programs Sábado Animado and Domingo Animado. In 2008, she was invited to star a segment in the Programa Silvio Santos, becoming a success for answering random questions by presenter Silvio Santos, owner of SBT and icon of Brazilian television. Maisa was sometimes called a "prodigy girl" and "the girl's on Silvio Santos's eyes" by the Brazilian media. Since then, she has been one of the leading artists of the network. In 2017 she presented her own program "Programa da Maisa" at SBT. In 2019, Maisa Silva was hired by Netflix Brazil series, back to 15. The series was released the following year. In the series, Maisa plays the protagonist Anita in her teenage version, while the adult version is played by Camila Queiroz. The series premiered in 2022 and due to success was renewed for a second season slated for 2023.

Leaving SBT
After 13 years at SBT, she decided not to renew with the broadcaster. She intended to work on personal projects.

Internet
Maisa began posting videos to her YouTube channel (named Maisera) in 2014, at age 12, with vlogs, interviews, music videos and more.

Filmography

Film

TV

Theater

Discography

Selected songs

 "Tudo Que Me Vem Na Cabeça" (2009)
 "Ô Tio" feat. Roger (2009)
 "Pipoca Pula" feat. Eliana (2009)
 "Tempo De Mudar" (2009)
 "Eu Cresci" (2014)
 "NheNheNhem" (2014)
 "Cabelo" (2014)

Bibliography

Awards and nominations

See also
Tudum Festival

References

External links

 
 

2002 births
Living people
Actresses from São Paulo (state)
Brazilian child actresses
Brazilian television actresses
Brazilian film actresses
Brazilian television presenters
People from São Bernardo do Campo
New York Film Academy alumni
21st-century Brazilian singers
21st-century Brazilian women singers
Brazilian women television presenters
Brazilian feminists